The Swift Shadow is a 1927 American action film directed by Jerome Storm and written by Ethel Hill. The film stars Ranger the Dog, Lorraine Eason, William Bertram, Sam Nelson, Albert J. Smith and Milburn Morante. The film was released on December 11, 1927, by Film Booking Offices of America.

Cast           
Ranger the Dog as Swift Shadow
Lorraine Eason as Helen Todd
William Bertram as Joseph Todd
Sam Nelson as Jim
Albert J. Smith as Butch Kemp 
Milburn Morante as Sheriff Miller

References

External links
 

1927 films
American action films
1920s action films
Film Booking Offices of America films
Films directed by Jerome Storm
American silent feature films
American black-and-white films
1920s English-language films
1920s American films